Kashanak (also Romanized as Kāshānak) is a village in Khalazir Rural District, Aftab District, Tehran County, Tehran Province, Iran. At the 2006 census, its population was 421, in 110 families.

References 

Populated places in Tehran County